This is a list of mountains of the Swiss canton of Graubünden. Graubünden is a very mountainous canton and lies entirely within the Alps. It is also one of the three cantons (with Valais and Bern) having summits over 4,000 metres. Topographically, the most important summit of the canton is that of Piz Bernina (most elevated, most prominent and most isolated). Outside the Bernina Range, the Tödi is both the highest and most prominent summit of the canton.

This list only includes significant summits with a topographic prominence of at least . There are over 430 such summits in Graubünden and they are found in all its 11 districts. All mountain heights and prominences on the list are from the largest-scale maps available.

List

Notes

References

Graubunden